A twin prime is a prime number that is either 2 less or 2 more than another prime number—for example, either member of the twin prime pair (41, 43). In other words, a twin prime is a prime that has a prime gap of two. Sometimes the term twin prime is used for a pair of twin primes; an alternative name for this is prime twin or prime pair.

Twin primes become increasingly rare as one examines larger ranges, in keeping with the general tendency of gaps between adjacent primes to become larger as the numbers themselves get larger.  However, it is unknown whether there are infinitely many twin primes (the so-called twin prime conjecture) or if there is a largest pair. The breakthrough work of Yitang Zhang in 2013, as well as work by James Maynard, Terence Tao and others, has made substantial progress towards proving that there are infinitely many twin primes, but at present this remains unsolved.

Properties
Usually the pair (2, 3) is not considered to be a pair of twin primes.  Since 2 is the only even prime, this pair is the only pair of prime numbers that differ by one; thus twin primes are as closely spaced as possible for any other two primes.

The first few twin prime pairs are:
(3,  5), (5,  7), (11, 13), (17, 19), (29, 31), (41, 43), (59, 61), (71, 73),  (101, 103), (107, 109), (137, 139), … .

As a result, the sum of any pair of twin primes (other than 3 and 5) is divisible by 12.

Brun's theorem

In 1915, Viggo Brun showed that the sum of reciprocals of the twin primes was convergent.  This famous result, called Brun's theorem, was the first use of the Brun sieve and helped initiate the development of modern sieve theory.  The modern version of Brun's argument can be used to show that the number of twin primes less than N does not exceed

for some absolute constant C > 0. In fact, it is bounded above by 

where , where C2 is the twin prime constant, given below.

Twin prime conjecture
The question of whether there exist infinitely many twin primes has been one of the great open questions in number theory for many years. This is the content of the twin prime conjecture, which states that there are infinitely many primes p such that p + 2 is also prime. In 1849, de Polignac made the more general conjecture that for every natural number k, there are infinitely many primes p such that p + 2k is also prime. The case k = 1 of de Polignac's conjecture is the twin prime conjecture.
 
A stronger form of the twin prime conjecture, the Hardy–Littlewood conjecture (see below), postulates a distribution law for twin primes akin to the prime number theorem.

On April 17, 2013, Yitang Zhang announced a proof that for some integer N that is less than 70 million, there are infinitely many pairs of primes that differ by N. Zhang's paper was accepted by Annals of Mathematics in early May 2013. Terence Tao subsequently proposed a Polymath Project collaborative effort to optimize Zhang's bound.  As of April 14, 2014, one year after Zhang's announcement, the bound has been reduced to 246. These improved bounds were discovered using a different approach that was simpler than Zhang's and was discovered independently by James Maynard and Terence Tao. This second approach also gave bounds for the smallest f(m) needed to guarantee that infinitely many intervals of width f(m) contain at least m primes. Moreover (see also the next section) assuming the Elliott–Halberstam conjecture and its generalized form, the Polymath project wiki states that the bound is 12 and 6, respectively.

A strengthening of Goldbach’s conjecture, if proved, would also prove there is an infinite number of twin primes, as would the existence of Siegel zeroes.

Other theorems weaker than the twin prime conjecture
In 1940, Paul Erdős showed that there is a constant  and infinitely many primes  such that  where  denotes the next prime after . What this means is that we can find infinitely many intervals that contain two primes  as long as we let these intervals grow slowly in size as we move to bigger and bigger primes. Here, "grow slowly" means that the length of these intervals can grow logarithmically. This result was successively improved; in 1986 Helmut Maier showed that a constant  can be used. In 2005, Goldston, János Pintz and Yıldırım established that  can be chosen to be arbitrarily small, i.e.

On the other hand, this result does not rule out that there may not be infinitely many intervals that contain two primes if we only allow the intervals to grow in size as, for example, .

The result of Yitang Zhang,

is a major improvement on the Goldston–Graham–Pintz–Yıldırım result. The Polymath Project optimization of Zhang's bound and the work of Maynard have reduced the bound: the limit inferior is at most 246.

Conjectures

First Hardy–Littlewood conjecture

The Hardy–Littlewood conjecture (named after G. H. Hardy and John Littlewood) is a generalization of the twin prime conjecture.  It is concerned with the distribution of prime constellations, including twin primes, in analogy to the prime number theorem. Let  denote the number of primes  such that  is also prime. Define the twin prime constant  as

(here the product extends over all prime numbers ). Then a special case of the first Hardy-Littlewood conjecture is that

in the sense that the quotient of the two expressions tends to 1 as  approaches infinity.  (The second ~ is not part of the conjecture and is proven by integration by parts.)

The conjecture can be justified (but not proven) by assuming that  describes the density function of the prime distribution.

The fully general first Hardy–Littlewood conjecture on prime k-tuples (not given here) implies that the second Hardy–Littlewood conjecture is false.

This conjecture has been extended by Dickson's conjecture.

Polignac's conjecture

Polignac's conjecture from 1849 states that for every positive even integer , there are infinitely many consecutive prime pairs  and  such that  (i.e. there are infinitely many prime gaps of size ). The case  is the twin prime conjecture. Indeed, if such a  did not exist, then for any positive even natural number  there are at most finitely many  such that  for all  and so for  large enough we have  which would contradict Zhang's result.

Large twin primes
Beginning in 2007, two distributed computing projects, Twin Prime Search and PrimeGrid, have produced several record-largest twin primes.  , the current largest twin prime pair known is 2996863034895 × 21290000 ± 1, with 388,342 decimal digits.  It was discovered in September 2016.

There are 808,675,888,577,436 twin prime pairs below 1018.

An empirical analysis of all prime pairs up to 4.35 × 1015 shows that if the number of such pairs less than x is f&hairsp;(x)&hairsp;·x&hairsp;/(log x)2 then f&hairsp;(x) is about 1.7 for small x and decreases towards about 1.3 as x tends to infinity. The limiting value of f&hairsp;(x) is conjectured to equal twice the twin prime constant (not to be confused with Brun's constant), according to the Hardy–Littlewood conjecture.

Other elementary properties
Every third odd number is divisible by 3, which requires that no three successive odd numbers can be prime unless one of them is 3. Five is therefore the only prime that is part of two twin prime pairs. The lower member of a pair is by definition a Chen prime.

It has been proven that the pair (m, m + 2) is a twin prime if and only if

If m − 4 or m + 6 is also prime then the three primes are called a prime triplet.

For a twin prime pair of the form (6n − 1, 6n + 1) for some natural number n > 1, n must end in the digit 0, 2, 3, 5, 7, or 8.

Isolated prime
An isolated prime (also known as single prime or non-twin prime) is a prime number p such that neither p − 2 nor p + 2 is prime. In other words, p is not part of a twin prime pair. For example, 23 is an isolated prime, since 21 and 25 are both composite.

The first few isolated primes are

2, 23, 37, 47, 53, 67, 79, 83, 89, 97, ... 

It follows from Brun's theorem that almost all primes are isolated in the sense that
the ratio of the number of isolated primes less than a given threshold n and the number of all primes less than n tends to 1 as n tends to infinity.

See also
 Cousin prime
 Prime gap
 Prime k-tuple
 Prime quadruplet
 Prime triplet
 Sexy prime

References

Further reading

External links
 
 Top-20 Twin Primes at Chris Caldwell's Prime Pages
 Xavier Gourdon, Pascal Sebah: Introduction to Twin Primes and Brun's Constant
 "Official press release" of 58711-digit twin prime record
 
 The 20 000 first twin primes
 Polymath: Bounded gaps between primes
 Sudden Progress on Prime Number Problem Has Mathematicians Buzzing

Classes of prime numbers
Unsolved problems in number theory